Jackinabox is the third studio album by the British band Turin Brakes. Recorded in their own recording studio in Brixton during 2004, the album includes the singles "Fishing For a Dream" and "Over and Over". It is the follow-up to Ether Song. The album reached no. 9 in the UK charts in the first week, despite the fact that first single, "Fishing for a Dream", did not sell well (charting at no. 35). The album was also released with a bonus DVD and on vinyl. The song "Red Moon" was later recorded in an unplugged version and released as an EP with new material.

The Japanese version had a bonus track, "Where I've Been", which was not released elsewhere.

Track listing

Charts

References

2005 albums
Turin Brakes albums